A filter funnel is a laboratory funnel used for separating solids from liquids via the laboratory process of filtering.

In order to achieve this, a cone-like shaped piece of filter paper is usually folded into a cone and placed within the funnel.  The suspension of solid and liquid is then poured through the funnel. The solid particles are too large to pass through the filter paper and are left on the paper, while the much smaller liquid molecules pass through the paper to a vessel positioned below the funnel, producing a filtrate.  The filter paper is used only once.  If only the liquid is of interest, the paper is discarded; if the suspension is of interest, both the solid residue and non-polar liquids, such as oil, may clog  of polyethylene or galvanized steel and using a brass or plastic mesh filter, are typically for automotive and workshop use, to filter debris from fuel, lubricating oil and coolant.  The screen is reusable, and may be cleaned by inverting the funnel and tapping it on a hard surface, or popping it out and washing it separately. This helps to avoid spilling any liquids.

References

Laboratory equipment
Water filters